Daniel Cavanagh (born 6 October 1972) is an English guitarist and singer who formed the British band Anathema in 1990 with his brother Vincent Cavanagh. He is the band's principal songwriter, a role he had previously shared with bassist Duncan Patterson until Patterson's departure in 1998.

Cavanagh has been involved in other projects including Leafblade, an acoustic & Celtic rock band, (guitars and vocals), and Antimatter, the former band of ex-Anathema member Duncan Patterson. He also played guitar on the album In the Mushroom with Lid. Cavanagh also provided vocals on an album by French post rockers Spherical Minds and was a guest on the album Pure Air by Agua de Annique, providing vocals and guitar on "The Blowers Daughter".

Background and early years
Cavanagh was raised in Anfield, Liverpool, in a working-class family. He has mentioned that Dire Straits and in particular Mark Knopfler were his first musical influences, and along with Queen were responsible for leading the young Cavanagh towards learning guitar. The seed was cemented in 1985 with the Live Aid concert and this is an event that Cavanagh still mentions as being what he regards one of the finest moments in the history of music and of mankind.
During his teenage years, Cavanagh discovered Iron Maiden who alongside bands like Metallica, Celtic Frost, Slayer, Bolt Thrower and later Paradise Lost, was a major influence in his interest in extreme metal.

Cavanagh has been praised for his ability to combine these left field influences gracefully into his own sound without alienating his core fanbase.

With Anathema

Alternative 4 era and family tragedy
Drummer John Douglas left the band for a short time ahead of the recording and release of Alternative 4; he was replaced by Shaun Steels, formerly of Solstice and later of My Dying Bride. Alternative 4 was composed chiefly by Cavanagh and bassist Duncan Patterson, met generally positive reviews, and marked the transition of the band from gothic metal towards a more alternative rock/goth sound.

Disaster struck soon after the album release. First, the Cavanagh brothers tragically lost their mother; Duncan Patterson then left the band. Despite all of this the band decided to focus on the development of a new album. John Douglas rejoined the band in time to tour the album and it took only a year before "Judgement" was released. Judgement was again met with positive reviews with allmusic giving it four out of five stars.

Apart from Vincent Cavanagh's vocals, Lee Douglas, younger sister of drummer John, made her debut appearance on the album and was eventually installed as a member of the band. Worth mentioning is "One Last Goodbye", a s
At this stage with Patterson gone, Cavanagh was in the spotlight as the driving musical force in the band and was rapidly being seen as a more influential figure in band's musical direction among the Anathema fans – affectionately known as Anathemaniacs.

Early 2000s

2001 saw "A Fine Day to Exit" and a shift in sound by the band. With a music video and lead single in "Pressure", the album was met with mixed response. Yet the song "Temporary Peace" became an Anathema classic to be mentioned in the same breath as songs like "Deep" or "Empty". This album was notable in that it was the debut of Les Smith on keyboards. It was also the album where John Douglas became noticed as a songwriter of considerable importance for the band, as he remains to the present day.

In early 2002, Cavanagh announced his departure from the band to reunite full-time with former bandmate Duncan Patterson on his Antimatter project. This caused a negative response from Anathema fans worldwide as many felt Daniel was impossible to replace. The split was short lived thankfully as he was back to the band in time for the festival season that summer.

"A Natural Disaster" saw Vincent's twin Jamie re-join the band on bass (a position he had held in the early days of the band). The resulting album was almost entirely composed by Daniel (with smaller contributions from the rest of the band) marking the end of a traumatic episode in his personal life. "A Natural Disaster" was overlooked in part due to Anathema's longtime label Music For Nations deciding to fold. With no real gain to be made for a company that would soon be defunct, MFN did little to promote the album. Despite this, the touring for the album was successful and the seven-year gap that followed until the next album saw the band finally emerge as a professional touring outfit. "A Natural Disaster", despite the odds, has become somewhat of a cult hit amongst the fans, containing some of Cavanagh's best songwriting ("Closer") as well as seeing him hit new levels in raw open emotion ("Electricity").

Anathema took massive steps towards becoming a professional live act during the seven years between albums with high-profile tours supporting HIM and Porcupine Tree expanding their fanbase. Cavanagh began to preview some new Anathema material during his solo shows, which led the band to record and release demo versions of future album songs for free on their official site.

Hindsight and We're Here Because We're Here

In late 2008, Anathema's new label K-Scope released a collection of old songs re-recorded in semi acoustic fashion with one new track "Tales of the Unexpected" included. Despite notable changes, there was generally favourable reaction to the re-worked old songs. This was an important step towards Anathema deciding on K-Scope as their new label.

Finally in May 2010, almost seven years after their last full album release, Anathema released their self-produced "We're Here Because We're Here" mixed by Steven Wilson of Porcupine Tree. The album has received massive response from all corners of the press and fan reactions have been positive. It was awarded the Prog Album of the Year award from media titan "Classic Rock".

Side-Project Weather Systems
In 2021, Cavanagh announced his return to music in the side-project "Weather Systems", consisting of himself and John Douglas.

Solo and acoustic
Around 2002, Cavanagh began to play solo shows throughout Europe, with himself on guitar and piano. These shows proved to be very popular amongst fans of the band as well as others curious to hear Danny's work. He successfully partnered for these shows with former The Gathering vocalist Anneke Van Giersbergen. A short Norwegian tour in 2006 led to Cavanagh meeting Haavard from Aftermath Music in Trondheim, resulting in Haavard becoming Daniel's main booking agent for his solo jaunts for some time after. This trip was also of considerable importance as it began Cavanagh's interest in Norway, something that has had a massive impact on his life ever since. It led, indirectly, to Cavanagh meeting Christer-André Cederberg who produced Anathema's last two studio albums and guided the band into previously unheralded realms of mainstream success, not least with the song "Anathema" (from 'Distant Satellites') winning Anthem of the Year at the 2014 Prog Awards, as voted for by the readers of Classic Rock's Prog Magazine.

In 2004, Cavanagh released 'A Place to Be' on Strangelight Records (run by ex-Anathema bassist Duncan Patterson) which featured him covering a collection of Nick Drake songs.
2009 saw him team up with frequent live collaborator Anneke van Giersbergen for the release of 'In Parallel' which saw them add their own unique touch to a number of their own songs as well as songs from other artists.
In 2013, he collaborated with Joseph Geraci, whose discussions of his own near-death experience had been sampled for the Anathema track "Internal Landscapes" from the Weather Systems album in 2012. 
In getting permission for the sample Cavanagh had been put in touch with Geraci and discovered that he had since amassed a large amount of writing based on the event, an event that Cavanagh had become quite touched by since learning of it.
The album 'Passage' was assembled and released in 2013 through Burning Shed.

2015 saw Cavanagh run a very successful PledgeMusic campaign for his album 'Memory and Meaning'. The album sees him record intimate and stripped-down versions of songs that have shaped his musical self through the years and contains versions of songs from artists such as Fleetwood Mac, Kate Bush, Pink Floyd, and Iron Maiden.

Personal life

In 2005, Cavanagh decided to quit alcohol and drugs, and pursue a more spiritual approach in his day-to-day life. He has touched upon the subject in interviews, stating that he is far happier now. This change has also happened to be in line with his most successful period as a musician and has seen Cavanagh live in London, Oslo and Liverpool during this time. . In 2020, Anathema and Cavanagh got in some serious financial trouble. It made him sell several of his guitars, one of which was purchased by a fan and gifted back to Cavanagh.

Discography
 A Place To Be - A Tribute to Nick Drake (2004) Strangelight Records
 In Parallel (2009) Angelic Recordings (with Anneke van Giersbergen)
 The Passage (2013) Burning Shed (with Joseph Geraci)
 Memory And Meaning (2015) 
 Monochrome (2017) Kscope

References

External links

Anathema official site
Leafblade on Myspace	

1972 births
Living people
English heavy metal guitarists
English heavy metal singers
21st-century English singers
21st-century British guitarists